Habberley may refer to:
Habberley, Shropshire, England
Habberley, Worcestershire, England